"Forget Him" is a song written by Tony Hatch and released in 1963 by Bobby Rydell. The song spent 16 weeks on the Billboard Hot 100 chart, peaking at No. 4 on January 18, 1964, while it spent 14 weeks on the United Kingdom's Record Retailer chart, reaching No. 13. The song also reached No. 3 on Billboards Middle-Road Singles chart, No. 3 on Canada's CHUM Hit Parade, No. 8 on the Irish Singles Chart, and No. 2 in Hong Kong.

The song first charted in the United Kingdom on May 29, 1963.  It received significant airplay, began to rise in the charts and was noticed by Paul McCartney. In 2000, McCartney said the initial idea for "She Loves You" came from a Bobby Rydell hit that was popular at the time (mid-1963). Lennon and McCartney started composing "She Loves You" on June 26, 1963 (about four weeks after the release of "Forget Him" in the UK). "She Loves You" was completed the following day.

"Forget Him" peaked in the United States in early 1964 and was ranked No. 20 on Cash Boxs "Top 100 Chart Hits of 1964".

Chart performance

Cover versions
English rock and roll singer Billy Fury covered "Forget Him" as a non-album single in 1983.  It became a hit in the United Kingdom, reaching #59.

References

External links
  

1963 songs
1963 singles
1983 singles
Bobby Rydell songs
Billy Fury songs
Cameo-Parkway Records singles
Songs written by Tony Hatch